The following is a partial list of condiments used in Pakistani cuisine:

Achars
Achar are made from certain varieties of vegetables and fruits that are finely chopped and marinated in brine or edible oils along with various spices. Some varieties of fruits and vegetables are small enough to be used whole. Some regions also specialize in pickling meats and fish.

 Carrot achar
 Cauliflower achar
 Garlic achar
 Gongura achar
 Green chilli achar
 Hyderabadi pickle
 Lemon achar
 Mango achar

Chutneys 

Chutney is a family of condiments associated with South Asian cuisine made from a highly variable mixture of spices, vegetables, or fruit.
   
 Cilantro chutney (coriander leaves)
 Coconut chutney
 Garlic chutney (made from fresh garlic, coconut and groundnut)
 Lime chutney (made from whole, unripe limes)
 Mango (keri) chutney (made from unripe, green mangoes)
 Mentha chutney 
 Onion chutney
 Tamarind chutney (Imli chutney)
 Tomato chutney

Sauces
 Raita (a cucumber yogurt dip)

See also

 List of condiments
 List of Pakistani spices

Condiments

Condiments